Ross Lake is a freshwater lake in the west of Ireland. It is part of the Lough Corrib catchment in County Galway.

Geography

Natural history
Fish species in Ross Lake include perch, roach, bream, pike and the critically endangered European eel. The lake is part of the Ross Lake and Woods Special Area of Conservation.

See also
List of loughs in Ireland

References

Ross